Route 362 is a scenic 50 km two-lane highway which follows the Saint Lawrence River in the Charlevoix region in Quebec, Canada. It starts at the junction of Route 138 in Baie-Saint-Paul and ends again at the junction of Route 138 in La Malbaie. Route 138 provides a more direct link between those two towns, and Route 362 is mainly a touristic route with vistas of the Saint Lawrence River, and the road goes up and down some serious hills next to the river.

Towns along Route 362
 Baie-Saint-Paul
 Saint-Joseph-de-la-Rive
 Les Éboulements
 Saint-Irénée
 La Malbaie

See also
 List of Quebec provincial highways

References

External links  
 Provincial Route Map (Courtesy of the Quebec Ministry of Transportation) 
 Route 362 on Google Maps

362
Baie-Saint-Paul